Playte may refer to:
 A member of the French electronic music band Dirtyphonics.
 A unit of information storage. See Units of information#Obsolete and unusual units.